La Ville-du-Bois is a commune in the southern suburbs of Paris, France.

Population
Inhabitants of La Ville-du-Bois are known as Urbisylvains in French.

Notable residents
Constantine Andreou, the Greek painter, once lived in La Ville-du-Bois. In 1999, the town's library was named in honor of Andreou.

See also
Communes of the Essonne department

References

External links

Official site

Mayors of Essonne Association 

Communes of Essonne